The biospeckle laser tool library, or BSLTL, is a free project to help researchers to work with dynamic speckle. The library is based on Mcode to GNU Octave and Matlab and in the free ebook A Practical Guide to Biospeckle Laser Analysis: Theory and Software.

Biospeckle laser 
Biospeckle laser is the nomination of dynamic speckle when the application is based on biological material.

Mcode Library 
The library based on Mcode is useful in GNU Octave and in Matlab, and it can be found in a free project

See also
Speckle pattern
Speckle noise
Speckle imaging

References 

Interference